This is the list of country courthouses in Nebraska; for federal ones, see List of United States federal courthouses in Nebraska.

The state of Nebraska has 93 counties.  The Nebraska State Historical Society conducted a 1990 study of county courthouses in the state.

Courthouses marked with a †dagger are listed on the National Register of Historic Places.

See also
List of United States federal courthouses in Nebraska
List of courthouses in the United States

References

Courthouses

Nebraska
Courthouses, county
Courthouses